Walloper Lake Provincial Park is a provincial park in British Columbia, Canada. Walloper Lake is a small lake located on the Trans-Canada Highway,  from the city of Kamloops.

Facilities
The park is a day use lake side facility and is equipped with a boat launch and a recently extended pier.

Fishing
The lake is known as a family fishing lake because of the readily catchable fish. The fish caught in Walloper lake spawn in a small creek on the south side of the lake. They vary in size from very small to three pounds.

References

Provincial parks of British Columbia
Thompson Country